Nina Chanel Abney is an American artist, based in New York. She was born in Harvey, Illinois. She is an African American contemporary artist and painter who explores race, gender, pop culture, homophobia, and politics in her work.

Personal life
Abney was raised by her mother Karla, her aunt, and her grandparents in Chicago. Her mother was also an artist, and Abney looked up to her. Abney used to play with her mother’s oil paints in their basement. She liked Archie Comics, the Berenstain Bears, and Disney movies, and would mimic characters from them. After her mother remarried and had a second daughter, the family moved around a lot, and Abney and her sister would often be the only black children in their class at school. Abney first met her biological father, who is a police officer, when he pulled her mother over for an alleged traffic violation while they were driving through Indiana. In 2015, Abney said that she and her father started to rebuild their relationship. After a fire at their home, Abney and her mother moved in with her aunt in Matteson, Illinois where she attended Rich South Campus High School. Abney said that she would get teased about “talking white” by other students. In order to connect with other students, she would take requests to draw “portraits of famous black figures in pop culture”. Abney began to explore art more formally in high school. She always knew that she wanted to be an artist, but she was not sure what that would look like. She said that it took her a while to find her voice when speaking out about issues that matter to her like the #blacklivesmatter movement. She is always shocked that her work has been exhibited in museums. Some of her influences are the animated series South Park and hip-hop music. She feels that, “anyone can be an artist if they want to create and express themselves.” Her advice to aspiring artists is, “Just do it”.

Style
Her work uses symbols and bright colors to present new ways of approaching loaded topics as she invites viewers to draw their own conclusions. Blending the playful and the serious, Abney has said that her work is "easy to swallow, hard to digest."

Abney does not plan ahead or sketch, rather she works intuitively and with a rhythm. “What colors feel right next to each other” improvisation is a large part of her process and she doesn’t know what the end result will be as her work is a response to what she is feeling in the moment. Jeffery Deitch, an art dealer and curator once compared her skill to that of  the artist Keith Haring.
Abney’s style of painting is mostly graphic, cubist, and color blocked paintings and murals, using techniques like spray painting, collaging, and layering shapes and symbols. She doesn’t want her figures to be “boxed in” and she wants her work to have multiple “answers”. Abney likes to switch around races and genders in her figures, so the viewer releases traditionally conformed ideas about the painting. She has stated, "I like to bring everybody's perspective in... I'd approach it from both sides of the story". She uses symbolic imagery in unconventional ways to portray a deeper message, but also visually keeping the image simple. For example, in one painting Abney uses a heart in multiple ways that, depending where it is placed and what purpose it has, could have many different meanings. Additionally, Abney likes to keep humor in her work because the topics of her work are so serious. She does this by using vibrant colors and drawing “cartoonish” figures. Abney feels that she works so instinctively now that she doesn’t know how to go back to her old style of painting. She wants her work to stay relevant and the message of her paintings to adapt to what is relevant in the future, “so it can be read in an entirely new way” as times change.

Education
In high school, Abney was encouraged by one of her teachers to take AP art. This led her to attend Augustana College in Rock Island, Illinois where she received a BFA with a dual major in studio art and computer science in 2004. While attending college, Abney took part in a campus-wide walkout in protest of the lack of diversity in the faculty, which contributed to the political focus of her art. After graduating, she took a year off working as an assembly line worker at Ford Motor Company. She quit after witnessing a co-worker get their leg crushed in an accident. She began to paint every day and was accepted to the Chicago Art Institute and the Parsons School of Design where she received an MFA in 2007. Abney decided to move to Jersey City to go to Parsons to get “a sense of independence”.

Career
Abney is best known for her colorful graphic large-scale paintings, four of which are included in the 30 Americans exhibition organized by the Rubell Museum of works by African American artists of the last three decades, which has toured museums and galleries in America since 2008. Her work has also appeared in the Whitney Museum, the Jack Shainman Gallery, as well as the Kravets Wehby Gallery in Chelsea.

At the start of her career, she felt that her work had to focus on race, but it has now evolved to focus more on whatever is relevant to her in the moment. She stated that, "Now [it’s] more reflective of what I actually deal with. Not that I don't deal with racism, but that's not my whole life"

In 2007, Abney received recognition for her painting Class of 2007, done for her MFA thesis show. The painting is a diptych. In one panel, she is depicted as a blonde officer carrying a gun. In the second panel, her MFA classmates, all white, are painted as black inmates in orange uniforms. She has stated that putting her classmates into her painting was “nothing personal…when I put people in my paintings now—it’s not you, it’s just a face.” She also stated that the show was “[her] only chance to get the attention of a gallery”. The painting was purchased by the Rubell family, owners of the Rubell Museum in Miami, Florida. Abney was the youngest artist to show in the 30 Americans exhibition that brought together the most current and influential African American artists contributing to the art world teachting.

Abney worked at THEARC run by the Corcoran Gallery of Art’s after school program ArtReach with youth creating a permanent mural in the DC area. This program focused on the importance of celebrities in culture, how celebrities hold a level of significance in people lives on the same level as politics, and how they connect to race issues in this country.

Abney has been a lecturer for universities and visual arts centers across the nation. In 2013, she was a guest lecturer at the New York Academy of Art and in 2015 she presented at the Summit Series in Utah.

News sources including the Huffington Post, Forbes and Elle Magazine have discussed Abney's attempts to address radical political topics by blending genders and race.

Exhibitions
Dirty Wash was Abney's first show, hosted at Kravets/Wehby gallery in the spring of 2008. Attracting many major collectors, the show sold out within days.

Abney had three paintings and one drawing in the Rubell Family Collection exhibition 30 Americans at the North Carolina Museum of Art, Raleigh, Corcoran Gallery of Art, Washington, D.C., and Chrysler Museum of Art, Norfolk, between 2008-2012.

In November 2017, she had her first solo show at Jack Shainman Gallery in New York City, Nina Chanel Abney: Seized the Imagination This exhibition ran concurrently with Safe House, a solo show curated by Piper Marshall at the Mary Boone Gallery in New York City. The artist is known for her colorful canvases, which are at times frenzied or chaotic, packed with pop culture imagery and references to current events. Abney locates much of her work in the recognition that abuse and violence are an integral part of the everyday consciousness of people of color. Abney’s aim in both shows is to combat the negative stereotypes with which the mainstream media often portrays African Americans. In December 2017, Abney created her first 3D installation at 29Rooms in Los Angeles called Fair Grounds, an interactive experiential series of sculptures that evokes the childhood look and feel of a playground.

Her first solo exhibition in a museum, Nina Chanel Abney: Royal Flush, opened at the Nasher Museum of Art at Duke University in Durham, North Carolina in February 2017. Curated by Marshall N. Price, the exhibition included about 30 of her paintings, watercolors, and collages and spans 10 years of her work. The works contain a wide range of art historical references, including medieval icons, Northern Renaissance still lifes, and artists such as Henri Matisse and John Wesley. They illustrate narcissism, celebrity culture, the objectification of women, issues of race, and police brutality. Abney stated that before she began working on this show, she “didn’t know what it was going to look like”. She got multiple cans a spray paint in many different colors, painted the walls black, and taped up shapes to start. Before the show opened, she said she “hoped that it makes people angry and a mix of reactions”.

In her February 2018 exhibition Hot to Trot. Not. at Palais de Tokyo in Paris, Abney created site specific murals along the institution’s main stairwell. One depicts the busts of three black women against a yellow background, the numbers 1, 2, 3 listed under each one. Next to the figures, Abney painted “WHAT?” in black letters — provoking viewers to look at the composition and then think critically about its meaning.

In September 2018, Abney curated a group exhibition at the Jeffery Deitch gallery entitled Punch. The exhibition called upon current socio-political issues. The exhibition featured Abney herself and some of her close friends. There were paintings, photographs and sculptures included in the exhibition.

Additional exhibitions include: 
 I Dread To Think, 2012 
Always a Winner, 2015 
Royal Flush, 2017
Fair Grounds, 2017 
Safe House, 2017 
Seized the Imagination, 2017
Hot to Trot. Not., 2018
Chicago Cultural Center, 2018
 Institute of Contemporary Art, Los Angeles & California African American Museum, 2018
 Neuberger Museum of Art, Purchase College, 2019

Collections
Her work is included in the collections of the Bronx Museum of the Arts; the Brooklyn Museum; the Museum of Modern Art; the Rubell Museum; and the Whitney Museum of American Art.

Books
30 Americans: Rubell Family Collection. Rubell Family Collection (publisher), 2012. By Robert Hobbs, Glen Logon, Franklin Sirmans and Michele Wallace. ISBN 978-0-9821195-5-6.
Nina Chanel Abney: Royal Flush. Duke University, 2017. By Marshall N. Price. .

References

External links

Interview in Phaidon
Interview in Huffington Post

American contemporary painters
1982 births
Living people
African-American contemporary artists
American contemporary artists
African-American women artists
American women painters
21st-century American painters
21st-century American women artists
African-American painters
21st-century African-American women
21st-century African-American artists
20th-century African-American people
20th-century African-American women
The New Yorker people